The Public Printer of the United States was the head of the United States Government Publishing Office (GPO). In December 2014, Congress passed and President Obama signed into law H.R. 83, which consolidated and continued appropriations for FY 2015. Section 1301 of that act changed the name of the Government Printing Office to the Government Publishing Office and the title of Public Printer to Director. Thus, Davita Vance-Cooks was the last Public Printer of the United States and the first Director of the U.S. Government Publishing Office.  

The Public Printer was responsible for the administration of the GPO. The GPO, a legislative agency of the government, provided electronic access to and produced most printed matter for government, including the Congressional Record, Supreme Court decisions, passports, tax forms, internal government documents, and agency publications. The GPO did not print money, as that is a duty of the Bureau of Engraving and Printing.

History
Benjamin Franklin served as Public Printer for several of the American colonies prior to the establishment of the United States. The House and Senate had separate printers until 1861, when the GPO was established; its first superintendent was John D. Defrees. The first man with the title Public Printer of the United States was Almon M. Clapp.

List of Superintendents 
 John D. Defrees (1861–1866)
 Cornelius Wendell (1866-1867)
 John D. Defrees (1867–1869)
 Almon M. Clapp (1869–1876)

List of Public Printers 
 Almon M. Clapp (1876–1877)
 John D. Defrees (1877–1882)
 Sterling P. Rounds (1882–1886)
 Thomas E. Benedict (1886–1889)
 Francis W. Palmer (1889–1894)
 Thomas E. Benedict (1894–1897)
 Francis W. Palmer (1897–1905)
 Charles A. Stillings (1905–1908)
 John S. Leech (1908)
 Samuel B. Donnelly (1908–1913)
 Cornelius Ford (1913–1921)
 George H. Carter (1921–1934)
 Augustus E. Giegengack (1934–1948)
 John J. Deviny (1948–1953)
 Raymond Blattenberger (1953–1961)
 James L. Harrison (1961–1970)
 Adolphus N. Spence (1970–1972)
 Thomas F. McCormick (1973–1977)
 John J. Boyle (1977–1980)
 Danford L. Sawyer, Jr. (1981–1984)
 Ralph E. Kennickell, Jr. (1984–1988)
 Robert Houk (1990–1993)
 Michael F. DiMario (1993–2002)
 Bruce James (2002–2006)
 Robert C. Tapella (2007–2010)
 William J. Boarman (2011–2012)
 Davita E. Vance-Cooks (2012–2014)

List of Directors 
 Davita E. Vance-Cooks (2014–2017)
 Hugh Nathanial Halpern (2019–present)

References

External links
 Government Printing Office

Employees of the United States Congress
Printing in the United States
Government occupations
United States Government Publishing Office